Longquan Temple may refer to:

 Longquan Monastery (龙泉寺), a Buddhist temple in Beijing, China
 Longquan Temple (Yuyao) (龙泉寺), a Buddhist temple in Yuyao, Zhejiang, China
 Longquan Temple (Yunnan) (龙泉观), a Taoist temple in Kunming, Yunnan, China